Hydrocarboniphaga daqingensis is a heterotrophic and aerobic bacterium from the genus of Hydrocarboniphaga which has been isolated from water from the Longhu Lake in Daqing in China.

References

External links
Type strain of Hydrocarboniphaga daqingensis at BacDive -  the Bacterial Diversity Metadatabase

Bacteria described in 2011
Gammaproteobacteria